Khanani may refer to:

 Altaf Khanani, Pakistani fraudster and money launderer
 Khanani and Kalia Int., Pakistani money service company involved in fraud